Sweets (stylized as SweetS) was a Japanese girl group formed by Avex Trax in 2003. It consists of five members: Aki, Aya, Haruna, Miori, and Mai. The group debuted in 2003 with the song "Lolita Strawberry in Summer" and released in 2004 the song "Love Like Candy Floss." While active as a group, Sweets was also part of the supergroup Girl's Box along with other Avex artists. After three years of activity, Sweets disbanded in 2006.

History

2003: Debut
During the Avex Auditions 2002, five 12-year-old girls were selected out of fifteen finalists to create a new girl group, with the project planned by TV Tokyo's variety show Platinum Ticket. They first performed at A-nation '03 Avex Summer Festa on April 12, 2003. Later, on August 27, they released their first single, "Lolita Strawberry in Summer", as the fourth ending theme to Monkey Typhoon. The song was produced by Bounceback, who had previously written songs for BoA and Ayumi Hamasaki. On November 19, 2003, Sweets released their second single, "Love Raspberry Juice", which was featured as the theme song in the commercial for the game Tokyo Friend Park II: Friend Park e Asobi ni Ikō!! 100 girls appeared as extras in the music video. At the end of 2003, Sweets collaborated with Dream and Fruits Punch as the supergroup Girl's Box to release the single 1st X'mas.

2004: "Love Like Candy Floss", Sweets
Sweets' third single, "Love Like Candy Floss", was released on February 11, 2004 as the theme song in the commercial for Circle K's bakery. The song's theme was described as "falling in love with a friend." The music video was filmed in Nagano, making it the first of their videos to be filmed outside of a studio, and was described as "drama-like", featuring Haruna following an older man. The music video was featured on the television show Pop Jam for four weeks. On March 3, 2004, Sweets released their first mini album, Sweets. On June 16, 2004, they released their fourth single, a triple A-side titled "Growin' into Shinin'" / "Never Ending Story" / "Shochū Omimai Mōshiagemasu." The song "Growin' into Shinin' Stars" was the official cheer song for the Yomiuri Giants beginning April 2004; "Never Ending Story" was the ending theme song to the variety show Doubutsu Kisou Tenkai from April to September 2004; and "Shochū Omimai Mōshiagemasu", a cover of the Candies song of the same name, was used as the theme song for a promotional campaign.  On November 3, 2004, Sweets released the song "Sky" as the ending theme to Genseishin Justirisers. By the end of the year, Sweets was voted number 1 in the magazine CD-Data. Later, Sweets participated in a second Christmas collaboration single with Dream and Aiko Kayō, which released on December 1, 2004.

===2005: Keep On Movin''', first tour, Aki and Aya's hiatus, 5 Elements===
On February 2, 2005, Sweets released the double A-side single "Countdown" / "Our Song (Wakare no Toki)", which was followed up with the release of their second mini album, Keep On Movin', on February 23, 2005. "Mienai Tsubasa" was released on June 1, 2005. The music video, as well as their behind-the-scenes DVD Wings of My Heart, were shot in Hawaii. Several members became ill during the shooting because of the rain.

On August 10, 2005, Sweets released their 8th single, "Earthship (Uchūsen Chikyūgō)", which was then followed up by their first concert tour named after the song, with three shows in Osaka, Nagoya, and Tokyo. Shortly after their tour, they performed at A-nation '05 and released their first photo book, Sweets #1. Afterwards, Aki and Aya went on hiatus from September 2005 to April 2006 to focus on their high school entrance exams. The remaining three members continued to promote without them and released "On the Way (Yakusoku no Basho e)" as their 9th single. On October 5, 2005, Sweets released their first studio album, 5 Elements. On November 16, 2005, Sweets collaborated with Dream, Nao Nagasawa, Nanase Hoshii, Aiko Kayō, Paradise Go! Go!, and Michi Saito for Girl's Box's third Christmas collaboration single.

2006: Disbandment
Aki and Aya returned from hiatus, and Sweets released the single "Bitter Sweets" on March 23, 2006. During a promotional event at Tokyo Dome City Hall on March 26, 2006, all five members of Sweets announced that they were disbanding, citing interest in different career paths, as well as Aki and Aya retiring to focus on high school. Afterwards, on June 7, 2006, they released "Color of Tears" as their final single along with Hi Ma'am, their "graduation" photo book, and Precious Memories'', their final behind-the-scenes DVD.

Members

  Aki - leader
 Aya
 Haruna
 Miori
 Mai

Discography

Studio albums

Extended plays

Compilation albums

Video albums

Singles

As lead artist

As featured artist

Video singles

DVDs

Publications

Photo books

References

External links
 

Japanese girl groups
Japanese pop music groups
Avex Group artists
Musical groups from Tokyo
Singing talent show winners